Roy Mauro (born 16 November 1990) is a Belgian footballer who plays as a centre-back for Belgian Division 2 club KRC Mechelen.

Career

Beerschot
Mauro played in the youth department of Lyra until in 2007, where he was included in the Germinal Beerschot academy. In 2008, he signed his first professional deal; a four-year contract. On 8 May 2009, Mauro made his debut in the first team on the penultimate matchday of the 2008–09 season, coming off the bench in the 73rd minute for Paul Kpaka in  a 3–1 home victory against Mechelen. 

The following two seasons, Mauro played on loan for Turnhout. In the 2011–12 season he returned to Beerschot, but was loaned out to KV Turnhout for another six months. At the end of the following season he left for Sint-Niklaas.

Later career
In July 2014, Mauro signed with Hoogstraten. From the 2016–17 season he began playing for Berchem. In January 2021 he moved to Londerzeel. He left the club in late 2022 due to personal reasons, and instead joined KRC Mechelen from January 2023.

References

External links
 Roy Mauro at Guardian Football
 

1990 births
Living people
Belgian footballers
Association football defenders
Belgian Pro League players
Challenger Pro League players
Belgian National Division 1 players
Beerschot A.C. players
KFC Turnhout players
K. Berchem Sport players
Sportkring Sint-Niklaas players
K.R.C. Mechelen players
Footballers from Antwerp